Brett Stewart may refer to:

Brett Stewart (rugby league) (born 1985), Australian rugby league footballer
Brett Stewart (director), American choir director